The Qishanyan Tunnel explosion happened on 2 May 2017. During construction of the Qishanyan railway tunnel in Dafang County, Guizhou, China an explosion occurred which killed 12 and injured 12 more workers. A suspected gas leak is being blamed as the cause of the explosion.

References

2017 disasters in China
Explosions in 2017
Explosions in China
History of Guizhou
May 2017 events in China